Thomas Dean Newell (born May 17, 1963) is a former Major League Baseball pitcher who played with the Philadelphia Phillies in 1987.

External links

1963 births
Living people
Major League Baseball pitchers
Baseball players from California
Philadelphia Phillies players
Albany-Colonie Yankees players
Bend Phillies players
Clearwater Phillies players
Columbus Clippers players
Fort Lauderdale Yankees players
Helena Phillies players
Maine Guides players
Maine Phillies players
Portland Beavers players
Reading Phillies players
Spartanburg Suns players